Nagshead is a woodland reserve, located on the western edge of Parkend, in the Forest of Dean, Gloucestershire, and is home to RSPB Nagshead. The site is listed in the 'Forest of Dean Local Plan Review'.

More than half of the reserve consists of 19th-century oak woodland, which is now managed solely for its conservation and landscape value.

In 1942, nest boxes were erected, in the hope that pied flycatchers would control oak leafroller moth larva, which were defoliating trees. These boxes have been continually monitored since 1948, making it the UK's longest-running bird breeding programme.
Nagshead includes a biological Site of Special Scientific Interest (SSSI).

Facilities

The reserve is open all year. Entrance and car parking are free.

Facilities include;
 Visitor centre and toilets (open at weekends during the summer).
 Large car park.
 Two viewing hides.
 Two way-marked walks (1 mile and 2.25 miles).
 Picnic area.
 Information boards.

Flora and Fauna

Birds

Birdlife in the reserve includes great spotted woodpecker, Eurasian nuthatch, northern goshawk and common buzzard. Breeding birds include common redstart, pied flycatcher, and common crossbill and wood warbler, some typical species of woodlands in the west of Britain. Redwing, hawfinch and Eurasian woodcock can be found in winter.

Other wildlife
More than 30 different butterflies and 20 dragonflies and damselflies have been seen at Nagshead. 8 of Britain's 12 reptiles and amphibians breed here; common lizard, slowworm, adder, grass snake, common frog, common toad, smooth newt and palmate newt.

Wild boar also roam Nagshead, but these are rarely seen.

Nagshead SSSI

A relatively small area of Nagshead reserve is designated a biological Site of Special Scientific Interest. This comprises 120.12 hectares and lies adjacent to the Nagshead Plantation, with the B4234 running through the middle of it. It is in the region of Nagshead Hill, Cleave Hill and Fetter Hill.

References

External links 
Royal Society for the Protection of Birds (RSPB)
Nagshead Nature Reserve Forestry England webpage
Natural England (SSSI information)
RSPB Nagshead, official website
Promotional video for RSPB Nagshead

Bibliography
RSPB Nagshead Trail Guide (leaflet)

Forest of Dean
Royal Society for the Protection of Birds reserves in England
Sites of Special Scientific Interest in Gloucestershire
Nature reserves in Gloucestershire